Dos basuras is a 1958 Argentine film. This black and white production was directed by Kurt Land and the script by Jose Maria Fernandez, Alfredo Unsain Ruanova, José María Fernández Unsain. It premiered on May 2, 1958, and starred Amelia Bence, Luis Prendes, Naomi Laserre and Luis Tasca as protagonists.

Synopsis
A prostitute and Cloaquista try to put their lives together but a former wife complicates the relationship.

Cast

 Amelia Bence ...María
 Luis Prendes ...Juan
 Noemí Laserre
 Luis Tasca
 Gloria Ferrandiz
 Ricardo Lavié ...María's Ex
 Jacques Arndt
 Félix Rivero
 Rafael Chumbita
 Carlos Spadavecchia
 Miguel Ángel Olmos
 Isidro Fernán Valdez
 Félix Camino
 Vicente Buono
 Beatriz Blassi
 Salvador Arcovichi
 Julio Sapia
 Josesito Ferradans
 Pedro Desio
 Marcelo Jaime
 Hermanas Galderisi
 Gina Cherini
 María Rodrigo
 Diana Romani
 Miguel Beltrán
 Alfredo Velázquez

References

External links
 

1958 films
1950s Spanish-language films
Argentine black-and-white films
Films directed by Kurt Land
1950s Argentine films